Vyacheslav Aleksandrovich Shishkin (born 1 February 1993) is a Russian football defender.

Club career
He made his debut in the Russian Second Division for FC Sibir-2 Novosibirsk on 5 June 2011 in a game against FC Yakutiya Yakutsk.

Shishkin played for FC Sibir in the Russian Football National League.

References

1993 births
Sportspeople from Novosibirsk
Living people
Russian footballers
Russia youth international footballers
Association football defenders
FC Sibir Novosibirsk players
FC Sokol Saratov players